In organosulfur chemistry, a sulfonate is a salt or ester of a sulfonic acid. It contains the functional group , where R is an organic group.  Sulfonates are the conjugate bases of sulfonic acids.  Sulfonates are generally stable in water, non-oxidizing, and colorless.  Many useful compounds and even some biochemicals feature sulfonates.

Sulfonate salts

Anions with the general formula  are called sulfonates. They are the conjugate bases of sulfonic acids with formula . As sulfonic acids tend to be strong acids, the corresponding sulfonates are weak bases. Due to the stability of sulfonate anions, the cations of sulfonate salts such as scandium triflate have application as Lewis acids.

A classic preparation of sulfonates is the Strecker sulfite alkylation, in which an alkali sulfite salt displaces a halide, typically in the presence of an iodine catalyst: 
RX + M2SO3 -> RSO3M + MX  
An alternative is the condensation of a sulfonyl halide with an alcohol in pyridine:
ROH{} + R'SO2Cl\ \overset{Pyr}{->}\ ROSO2R' + HCl

Sulfonic esters
Esters with the general formula R1SO2OR2 are called sulfonic esters.  Individual members of the category are named analogously to how ordinary carboxyl esters are named. For example, if the R2 group is a methyl group and the R1 group is a trifluoromethyl group, the resulting compound is methyl trifluoromethanesulfonate.

Sulfonic esters are used as reagents in organic synthesis, chiefly because the RSO3− group is a good leaving group, especially when R is electron-withdrawing. Methyl triflate, for example, is a strong methylating reagent.

Sulfonates are commonly used to confer water solubility to protein crosslinkers such as N-hydroxysulfosuccinimide (Sulfo-NHS), BS3, Sulfo-SMCC, etc.

Sultones

Cyclic sulfonic esters are called sultones. Two examples are propane-1,3-sultone and 1,4-butane sultone. Some sultones are short-lived intermediates, used as strong alkylating agents to introduce a negatively charged sulfonate group. In the presence of water, they slowly hydrolyze to the hydroxy sulfonic acids. Sultone oximes are key intermediates in the synthesis of the anti-convulsant drug zonisamide.

Tisocromide is an example of a sultone.

Examples
Mesylate (methanesulfonate), 
Triflate (trifluoromethanesulfonate), 
Ethanesulfonate (esilate, esylate),
Tosylate (p-toluenesulfonate), 
Benzenesulfonate (besylate), 
Closilate (closylate, chlorobenzenesulfonate), 
Camphorsulfonate  (camsilate, camsylate), 
Pipsylate (p-iodobenzenesulfonate derivative).
Nosylate

See also
Sulfate
Sulfoxide
Sulfonyl

References

Functional groups
Leaving groups